The 1994 Triple J Hottest 100, counted down in January 1995, was a countdown of the most popular songs of the year, according to listeners of the Australian radio station Triple J. A CD featuring 32 of the songs was released. A countdown of the videos of most of the songs was also shown on the ABC music series Rage.

Full list

26 of the 100 tracks are by Australian artists (marked with a green background).

Artists with multiple entries

Countries represented

CD release

There have been 3 release versions of this compilation album. The original version's track listing is listed below, and has been discontinued by manufacturer. The second version was a reissue by Universal released shortly after the original release. It features the same track listing as the original print. Strangely enough, the catalogue number corresponds with 2004 releases, the year when Universal began reissuing Hottest 100 CDs, despite this being released in 1995. The third version was released in 2004, this time by Warner Music. The track listing is different from the previous releases. "Closer" and "Seether" have been removed, and "A Certain Slant of Light" was moved up to track 2 on Disc 1.

Despite being released under Nick Cave and the Bad Seeds, "Do You Love Me?" is listed on here as just Nick Cave.

Disc 1

Disc 2

Certifications

References

See also
1994 in music

1994
1994 in Australian music
1994 record charts